Bois-Blanc is a settlement in New Brunswick.  The community is located mainly on Route 135.

History

Notable people

See also
List of communities in New Brunswick

References
 

Settlements in New Brunswick
Communities in Gloucester County, New Brunswick